Ivielum is a monotypic genus of dwarf spiders containing the single species Ivielum sibiricum. It was first described by K. Y. Eskov in 1988, and has only been found in Canada, Mongolia, and Russia.

See also
 List of Linyphiidae species (I–P)

References

Linyphiidae
Monotypic Araneomorphae genera
Spiders of Asia
Spiders of North America
Spiders of Russia